"How's It Going to Be" is a song by American rock band Third Eye Blind from their eponymous debut studio album (1997). It was released to radio as the third single from the album on October 20, 1997, by Elektra Records. Frontman Stephan Jenkins and guitarist Kevin Cadogan are credited as writers of the song. Production on the song was helmed by Jenkins, Eric Valentine, and Ren Klyce, with additional production and arrangement by Arion Salazar and Cadogan. According to Jenkins, the song is about the end of a relationship and the transition to acquaintanceship. 

The song was recorded in and around San Francisco at Toast Studios, Skywalker Ranch, and H.O.S. by Valentine. Tom Lord-Alge was responsible for the mixing of the track, which was made at South Beach Studios in Miami Beach. "How's It Going to Be" was one of the first demos recorded for Third Eye Blind, being recorded alongside the first iteration of "Semi-Charmed Life". An alternative rock song, the song's concept was developed after Cadogan played an autoharp, which inspired feelings of nostalgia among the band members. The instrumentation used in the song also includes guitars, drums, and a cello.

"How's It Going to Be" received positive reviews from music critics, who praised Cadogan's distinct use of an autoharp in the instrumentation. The song peaked at number nine on the US Billboard Hot 100, giving Third Eye Blind their second entry on the chart and their second top ten hit. Internationally, "How's It Going to Be" was a top 40 hit in three countries. On the 1998 year-end charts, the song peaked at number sixty-seven on the Canada Top Singles chart and number eleven on the US Billboard Hot 100 chart, respectively.

Writing and inspiration
"How's It Going to Be" was written by Stephan Jenkins and Kevin Cadogan. In an interview with Jenkins published in Billboard, he explained:

Recording and mixing
The recording sessions for "How's It Going to Be" took place in and around San Francisco, California at Toast Studios, Skywalker Ranch, and H.O.S. Production on the song was helmed by Jenkins, Eric Valentine, and Ren Klyce, with additional production and arrangement by Arion Salazar and Kevin Cadogan. The song was engineered by David Gleeson, with additional engineering by Valentine. Tom Lord-Alge was responsible for the mixing of the track, which was made at South Beach Studios in Miami Beach, Florida.

Composition

"How's It Going to Be" is an alternative rock song. According to the sheet music published at Musicnotes.com by Alfred Publishing, the song is written in the key of F major and is set in time signature of common time with a tempo of 78 beats per minute. Jenkin's vocal range spans one octave, from C4 to A5.

Critical reception
Arielle Gordon of Pitchfork praised Kevin Cadogan's use of an autoharp on the song's opening chords.

Chart performance
In the United States, "How's It Going to Be" debuted at number 36 on the Billboard Hot 100 chart for the issue dated December 6, 1997. The song reached its peak after eleven weeks, peaking at number nine for the issue dated February 14, 1998. The song spent a total of 52 weeks on the chart, with the week of November 28, 1998, being its final appearance on the chart.

Music video
The music video was directed by Nigel Dick and was filmed between September 6 and 7, 1997 in Spring Street, Los Angeles. In the video, the band members are in a car parked on a city street. On the opposite sidewalk, they spot a woman carrying many items (implied as an ex-girlfriend) enter a nearby building and immediately bring their instruments inside. They follow her to her office. As the band performs in front of the office, the woman hides behind a divider as another employee calls building security.

Live performances
The song was regularly performed on Third Eye Blind's debut headlining tour, The Bonfire Tour (1998).

Cover versions
In 2011, PT Walkley sang a cover of this song for the romantic film Something Borrowed.

In 2015, American indie rock band Widowspeak released a cover of "How's It Going to Be" on their single Two Covers.

Track listings and formats
 US and Australian CD, US cassette
 "How's It Going to Be"  – 4:16
 "Horror Show"  – 4:10

 European maxi and French CD 1
 "How's It Going to Be"  – 4:13
 "Graduate" (Remix) – 3:25
 "Horror Show"  – 4:10

 French CD 2
 "How's It Going to Be"  – 4:12
 "Semi-Charmed Life"  – 4:27
 "Horror Show"  – 4:10

Credits and personnel
Credits and personnel are adapted from Third Eye Blind album liner notes.
 Stephan Jenkins – vocals, producer
 Kevin Cadogan – guitar, vocals, autoharp
 Arion Salazar – bass, vocals
 Michael Urbano – drums
 Ari Gorman – cello
 Eric Valentine – engineer, producer
 Ren Klyce – producer

Charts

Weekly charts

Year-end charts

Release history

References

Third Eye Blind songs
1997 songs
1997 singles
Music videos directed by Nigel Dick
Songs written by Stephan Jenkins
Songs written by Kevin Cadogan
Song recordings produced by Eric Valentine
Elektra Records singles